Mirsad is a masculine given name of classical Arabic origin, meaning "watch tower". It is a fairly common name among South Slavs of Muslim heritage. The feminine version is Mirsada. 

People named Mirsad include:

 Mirsad Bektić, Bosnian-American mix martial artist
 Mirsad Baljić, Yugoslav footballer
 Mirsad Bektašević, Swedish Islamist
 Mirsad Bešlija, Bosnian footballer
 Mirsad Fazlagić, Bosnian footballer
 Mirsad Hibić, Bosnian footballer
 Mirsad Huseinovic, American soccer player
 Mirsad Jonuz, Macedonian footballer
 Mirsad Mijadinoski, Macedonian footballer
 Mirsad Terzić, Bosnian footballer
 Mirsad Türkcan, Turkish basketball player of Bosnian/Serbian origin
 Mirsada Burić, Bosnian long-distance runner, famous for training under sniper fire in the streets of Sarajevo for the 1992 Summer Olympics

See also 
 Mirsad-1, small reconnaissance drone

Bosnian masculine given names